The Greby grave field (Swedish: Greby gravfält) is an Iron Age grave field in western Sweden. It is located north of Grebbestad, Tanum Municipality in Västra Götaland County. With its 220 graves, it is the largest site of this kind in Bohuslän.

In June 1873, Swedish archaeologist and cultural historian Oscar Montelius (1843–1921) examined eleven of the graves. The grave inventory included glass pearls, bone combs and other everyday objects, dating  to the time of migration (approx. 400-500 AD).
Similar artifacts have been found in a number of other places in Sweden as well as in Norway, Germany and England
 

Newer findings indicate that Greby might have been an ancient trading site.

References

Iron Age sites in Europe
Buildings and structures in Västra Götaland County
Archaeological sites in Sweden
Burial monuments and structures
Germanic archaeological sites
History of Bohuslän
Geography of Västra Götaland County